Corinth is an unincorporated community in Milam County, Texas, United States. Corinth was established in 1847 and was named for Ancient Corinth. By 1903, Corinth had a school, which was consolidated into the Buckholts school district in 1950.

References

Unincorporated communities in Milam County, Texas
Unincorporated communities in Texas
Populated places established in 1847
1847 establishments in Texas